Omloop Het Nieuwsblad, previously Omloop Het Volk, is a one-day road cycling race in Belgium, held annually in late February. It is the opening event of the Belgian cycling season, as well as the first race of the year in Northwestern Europe, and holds significant prestige because of it. Since 2017, the race is part of the UCI World Tour, cycling's top-tier professional events.

The race starts in Ghent, Flanders and finishes in Ninove, Flanders. The race route covers the hills in the Flemish Ardennes, marking the start of the cobbled classics season in Europe. Due to its early calendar date, it is characterized by often cold weather, coming as a contrast to the early-season stage races in the Middle East and Southern Europe. The day after the Omloop, Kuurne–Brussels–Kuurne completes the opening weekend.

Since 2006, a women's edition of Omloop Het Nieuwsblad is held on the same day as the men's race, also starting in Ghent and finishing in Ninove, approximately 130 kilometres in distance. Both events are organized by Flanders Classics.

History

Omloop Het Volk
First held in 1945, the race was called Omloop van Vlaanderen ("Circuit of Flanders"). The event was initiated by Flemish newspaper Het Volk, in response to rivaling newspaper Het Nieuwsblad'''s classic, the Tour of Flanders. Het Volk, of left-leaning publication, wanted to start a new cycling event in Flanders as a rival race to what it saw as the Tour of Flanders' closeness to the Nazis during World War II. The Ronde's organizers protested that the name was too close to their own – there is little semantic difference between "Ronde" and "Omloop". The Belgian cycling federation demanded Het Volk to change the name of the event, prompting Het Volk to serve as title sponsor of their own race.Vanwalleghem, Rik, Het Wonder van Vlaanderen, Pinguin, Belgium, p72 In 2009 the former rival newspapers Het Volk and Het Nieuwsblad merged, causing the event to be renamed Omloop Het Nieuwsblad for its 64th edition. Until 2016, Omloop Het Nieuwsblad was ranked as a 1.HC event of the UCI Europe Tour; since 2017, it is included in the UCI World Tour.

Winter race
Due to its early-season calendar date, the race has occasionally been affected by cold and wintry conditions. Three editions of the event were cancelled. The 1971 race was postponed due to snow and run three weeks later. In 1986 and 2004 organizers were forced to cancel the race, as snow and freezing temperatures had made the route too dangerous and riders' safety could not be guaranteed. In modern times, organizers rely heavily on weather forecasts and adjust the course if some sectors are deemed unsafe. Unrelated to the weather, the 1960 race was cancelled following a disagreement between the organizers and cycling's ruling body UCI.

Belgian opening race
Traditionally the opening event of the Belgian cycling season, the race holds particular importance for Belgian cyclists. Throughout its history, Belgian riders, comfortable with cold weather and aided by large, supportive crowds, have dominated the race. Belgians have won 56 editions, although, exemplary for the growing international status of the race, they have only won four of the last ten editions. In 1948 Italian cycling icon Fausto Coppi won the race, but was disqualified for receiving an illegal wheel-change.

The record for wins is three, shared by Joseph Bruyère, Ernest Sterckx and Peter van Petegem. Bruyère holds the fastest average (43.35 km/h) for his 1975 win. Other notable winners include Eddy Merckx, Roger De Vlaeminck, Freddy Maertens, Johan Museeuw, Philippe Gilbert and Thor Hushovd.

Route

Omloop Het Nieuwsblad starts in Ghent, East Flanders, and addresses the Flemish Ardennes in the south of the province, featuring numerous short climbs, before returning to Ghent. From 1996 until 2007 the finish was in Lokeren, 20 km east of Ghent.

At 200 kilometres and with 13 climbs in the hill zone, the course is challenging and arduous. Additionally, there are several flat stretches of cobbles. Despite annual changes, some of the regular climbs in the Omloop are the Leberg, Berendries, Taaienberg, Muur van Geraardsbergen, Eikenberg and Molenberg. Due to its hilly course in the Flemish Ardennes, the race is similar in nature to the Tour of Flanders, and is often used in preparation for the bigger event five weeks later. The 2016 race featured one new climb, Boembekeberg, as a replacement for the Molenberg, which was skipped because of road works. This was reversed for the 2017 race.

Both the official start and finish are traditionally on Ghent's largest square, Sint-Pietersplein. Every seven years however, when Easter comes early in the year, the square is booked for the annual Mid-Lent fair and organizers need to find different locations. In 2016 and 2017, the Citadel city park, next to the Kuipke velodrome, served as start location. The finish was on the Emile Clauslaan thoroughfare, near the starting place.

Men's winners
The following riders have won the race:

Multiple winnersRiders in italics are activeWins per country

Women
Since 2006 there is a women's version of the Omloop Het Nieuwsblad. Held on the same day as the men's event, it uses much of the same roads and equally opens the women's cycling season in Northern Europe. In recent editions the route is 122 km, featuring eight climbs and six sections of cobbles. The race became part of the UCI Women's WorldTour in 2023. , Dutch riders Suzanne de Goede, Anna van der Breggen and Annemiek van Vleuten and Sweden's Emma Johansson have won the race twice.

Multiple winners

Wins per country

Omloop Het Nieuwsblad U23

An edition of the race for under-23 men has been held since 1950.

Notes

References and footnotes
 European Cycling – The 20 Greatest Races'' by Noel Henderson (1989) .

External links

 
UCI World Tour races
UCI Europe Tour races
Recurring sporting events established in 1945
1945 establishments in Belgium
Annual sporting events in Belgium
Winter events in Belgium
Super Prestige Pernod races